Jason Kelvin Scotland CM (born 18 February 1979) is a Trinidadian former professional footballer and current coach of Larkhall Thistle who last played for Scottish team Hamilton Academical.

Scotland started his footballing career in his native Trinidad and Tobago before moving to play professionally for Scottish club Dundee United. He has also had spells with St Johnstone, Swansea City, Wigan Athletic, Ipswich Town, Barnsley and Hamilton Academical. He made 41 international appearances and scored 8 goals for Trinidad and Tobago between 2000 and 2012, playing at the 2005 CONCACAF Gold Cup and the 2006 FIFA World Cup.

Club career

Early career and Dundee United
Born in Morvant, Trinidad and Tobago, after playing for Malick Senior Comprehensive School, Scotland went on to play with San Juan Jabloteh – for whom he scored nine goals in as many league games – and Defence Force, where he scored 30 goals in 31 league appearances. This goalscoring form earned him a trial with Scottish side Dundee United in May 2003 alongside fellow Trinidad player Devon Mitchell.

After impressing the staff, Scotland joined compatriot Collin Samuel at Tannadice after gaining a work permit in July. After making his debut in August 2003, Scotland featured mostly as a substitute in his first season and was wanted on loan by Northern Irish club Linfield in January 2004, although no move materialised. In March, Scotland scored his first goal for United, netting in a 3–2 win at Livingston and four days later scored the only goal in a 1–0 home win against Motherwell. With three more goals that season, Scotland scored five league goals from 21 appearances, with the majority as substitute appearances, and was awarded a new contract.

In Scotland's second season, it again took him several months to score, netting his first of the season in late December. In April, however, Scotland scored perhaps his most important goal of the season, netting the winner in the Scottish Cup semi-final to take United into the final. He went on to play the full 90 minutes of the showpiece match as United narrowly lost 1–0 to Celtic.

St Johnstone
In July 2005, Scotland was denied a new work permit and the club made an appeal, which was deemed unsuccessful by a Scottish Premier League appeals committee. Within three weeks, St Johnstone of the Scottish First Division were successful in gaining a work permit for the player – despite using the same dossier as United had presented previously. Scotland went on to net 15 goals in 31 league appearances in his first season at McDiarmid Park, including a goal on his debut and a hat-trick in April. He was named in Trinidad Tobago's 2006 FIFA World Cup squad. Scotland's second season produced 18 league goals, including a goal against former club Dundee United in a League Cup match; despite his goal against his former club, he received a warm reception from the United fans. In February 2007, Scotland was the subject of racist taunts by a small section of Motherwell fans during St Johnstone's visit to Fir Park in the quarter-finals of the Scottish Cup. He went on to score Saints' second goal in a 2–1 victory. In April 2007, Scotland was one of three St Johnstone players named in the SPFA's Scottish Division One 'Team of the Year', voted for by the managers. At the end of the 2006–07 season, in his two campaigns with St Johnstone, Scotland had scored 33 goals in 66 league games for the club, an average of one every two games.

Swansea City
In May 2007, Scotland signed for Swansea City for a fee of £25,000 subject to obtaining a work permit, which was granted on 4 July. He scored on his debut and he helped the team to promotion to the Football League Championship, finishing the season with 29 goals in all competitions – the division's top scorer – and also earning himself a place in the PFA Team of the Year.

Scotland netted a 78th minute penalty kick against Plymouth Argyle on 10 March 2009, his 50th goal for Swansea in all competitions

Wigan Athletic
Scotland signed for Wigan on a three-year contract on 18 July, after receiving international and visa approval. He made his debut as a stoppage time substitute in a 2–0 victory over Aston Villa on 15 August. He scored his first goal for Wigan in the FA Cup against Notts County on 23 January 2010. He scored his first league goal for the club on his 29th league appearance against Fulham on 4 April 2010. He was allowed to leave in June 2010.

Ipswich Town
Scotland signed for Ipswich Town on 23 August 2010, initially on a two-year deal for a fee of £500,000. He made his Ipswich debut against Crewe in the League Cup and then scored his first goal for the club on his league debut against Bristol City on 28 August 2010. In April 2012, he was praised by manager Paul Jewell for turning down a clause in his contract which would have meant that he would have received a wage increase.

He left Ipswich Town on 21 January 2013, after agreeing a contract settlement. The move proved somewhat controversial among some fans of the club considering Scotland had developed into somewhat of a fan favourite as an impact substitute. It was also deemed a rash move from the club since fellow striker Nathan Ellington remained at the club with a goal total of zero.

Barnsley
On 28 January 2013 it was announced that Scotland signed for Championship side Barnsley until the end of the season. His first appearance for Barnsley came as a substitute in a 2–0 victory against Millwall at Oakwell, where he scored the second goal, only a few minutes after coming on to the field of play.

On 4 May 2013, he scored Barnsley's second goal in a 2–2 draw away against Huddersfield Town, heading home a David Perkins cross, helping Barnsley to a point which ultimately secured the Reds' place in the Championship for another season.

Hamilton Academical
On 22 January 2014, Scotland signed for Hamilton Academical on a free transfer. He scored against Hibernian in the second leg of a promotion/relegation play-off on 25 May, also scoring in the subsequent penalty shootout as Hamilton won promotion to the Scottish Premiership.

He was released by Hamilton on 3 January 2015, but then re-signed for the club on 27 January 2015 until the end of the season. He was released by Hamilton after the 2014–15 season.

Stenhousemuir
Scotland signed a short-term contract with Stenhousemuir in October 2015.

Lochee Harp JFC
On 1 February 2018, Scotland penned a short-term deal with Dundee-based East Region/North Division side Lochee Harp.

On 29 March 2019, Scotland joined the Nico's Cafe Bar pub team until the ended of the season

International career
Scotland made his debut for Trinidad and Tobago in 2000 and went on to earn 41 cap, scoring 8 goals. He was a member of the squad at the 2005 CONCACAF Gold Cup and also at the 2006 FIFA World Cup, but saw no playing time in the latter tournament. In late September 2011, he announced his retirement from international football to concentrate on his club career with Ipswich Town.

Coaching career
In 2017, Scotland returned to Hamilton Academical, one of his former clubs as a player, to become a coach specialising in training their forwards, while also assisting with their youth academy teams. He left the club in January 2019 along with the manager Martin Canning in a staffing restructure.

Prior to the start of the 2021 season Jason joined the coaching team at Larkhall Thistle

Personal life
As a member of the squad that competed at the 2006 FIFA World Cup in Germany, Scotland was awarded the Chaconia Medal (Gold Class), the second highest state decoration of Trinidad and Tobago.

In popular culture
In June 2006, ahead of the World Cup, he was the subject of the song "Scotland, Scotland, Jason Scotland" by The Trinidad and Tobago Tartan Army. The song topped the Scottish Singles Chart and peaked at number 30 in the UK Singles Chart.

Career statistics

Club

International

Scores and results list Trinidad and Tobago's goal tally first, score column indicates score after each Scotland goal.

Honours
Dundee United
Scottish Cup runner-up: 2004–05

Swansea City
Football League One: 2007–08

Hamilton Academical
Scottish Championship: 2013–14

Individual
TT Pro League Golden Boot: 2000
Scottish First Division top scorer: 2005–06
PFA Scotland Team of the Year: 2006–07 First Division
Football League One Player of the Month: December 2007, March 2008
Football League One top scorer: 2007–08
Swansea City Player of the Year: 2007–08
Trinidad and Tobago Football Federation Player of the Year: 2008
PFA Team of the Year: 2007–08 League One, 2008–09 Championship
Football League Championship Player of the Month: February 2009
Ipswich Town Goal of the Season: 2011–12

Medals
 Chaconia Medal Gold Class: 2006

References

External links

Socawarriors profile

1979 births
Living people
Trinidad and Tobago footballers
Trinidad and Tobago international footballers
Association football forwards
San Juan Jabloteh F.C. players
Defence Force F.C. players
Dundee United F.C. players
Ipswich Town F.C. players
St Johnstone F.C. players
Swansea City A.F.C. players
Wigan Athletic F.C. players
Barnsley F.C. players
Hamilton Academical F.C. players
2005 CONCACAF Gold Cup players
2006 FIFA World Cup players
TT Pro League players
Scottish Premier League players
Scottish Football League players
Scottish Professional Football League players
Premier League players
English Football League players
Trinidad and Tobago expatriate footballers
Expatriate footballers in Scotland
Expatriate footballers in Wales
Expatriate footballers in England
Recipients of the Chaconia Medal
Trinidad and Tobago expatriate sportspeople in England
Trinidad and Tobago expatriate sportspeople in Scotland
Trinidad and Tobago expatriate sportspeople in Wales
Stenhousemuir F.C. players
Hamilton Academical F.C. non-playing staff
Lochee Harp F.C. players
Scottish Junior Football Association players